K. Lingamuthu is an Indian politician and was a member of the 14th Tamil Nadu Legislative Assembly from the Gudiyatham constituency. He represented the Communist Party of India.

The elections of 2016 resulted in his constituency being won by C. Jayanthi Padmanabhan.

References 

Tamil Nadu MLAs 2011–2016
Living people
Communist Party of India politicians from Tamil Nadu
Year of birth missing (living people)